Rhodeus laoensis  is a tropical freshwater fish belonging to the subfamily Acheilognathinae of the family Cyprinidae. It originates in Nam Theun River in the Mekong Delta in Laos.  The fish reaches a length up to 4.7 cm (1.9 in). When spawning, the females deposit their eggs inside bivalves, where they hatch and the young remain until they can swim.  It was discovered in 1998 along with 21 other species by Maurice Kottelat

References 
 

Fish described in 1998
Taxa named by Maurice Kottelat
laoensis
Fish of the Mekong Basin
Fish of Laos